Northland Community & Technical College (Northland) is a public, two-year community and technical college with campuses located in Thief River Falls and East Grand Forks, Minnesota, United States. Northland also has an aerospace site in Thief River Falls and a satellite site in Roseau, Minnesota. Northland offers certificates, diplomas, transfer courses, two-year degrees (A.A.S., A.S., A.A.) in more than 80 areas of study, workforce training and education programs. The two campuses serve over 4,000 full and part-time students. The college also has an NJCAA Division III athletics program with the nickname Pioneers. Northland is a member of Minnesota State Colleges and Universities system or Minnesota State System, the fourth-largest system of two-year colleges and four-year universities in the United States, and is accredited by the Higher Learning Commission of the North Central Association.

References

External links
 
Official Pioneers athletics website

Community colleges in Minnesota
Two-year colleges in the United States
Education in Polk County, Minnesota
Education in Pennington County, Minnesota
Buildings and structures in Polk County, Minnesota
Buildings and structures in Pennington County, Minnesota
NJCAA athletics
Thief River Falls, Minnesota